Srđan Kočić (born 27 November 1999), is a Bosnian professional basketball player who last played for Vojvodina of the Basketball League of Serbia and the Adriatic 2 League. Kočić is a member of Bosnia and Herzegovina national youth basketball team.

Playing career 
On 22 August 2019, Kočić signed for Igokea of the ABA League. On 8 January 2021, he signed for Borac Banja Luka. In August 2021, he signed for Vojvodina of the Basketball League of Serbia.

National team career 
Kočić was a member of the Bosnia and Herzegovina U16 team that won the gold medal at the 2015 FIBA Europe Under-16 Championship. Over nine tournament games, he averaged 1.9 points, 2.7 rebounds and 1.0 rebounds per game. He also played at the 2016 FIBA Under-17 World Championship. Over four tournament games, he averaged 2.0 points, 6.0 rebounds and 2.8 rebounds per game.

References

External links
 Srđan Kočić at abaliga.com
 Srđan Kočić at eurobasket.com
 Srđan Kočić at euroleague.net

1999 births
Living people
ABA League players
Basketball League of Serbia players
Bosnia and Herzegovina expatriate basketball people in Serbia
Bosnia and Herzegovina men's basketball players
KK Budućnost players
KK Igokea players
KK Studentski centar players
KK Vojvodina players
OKK Spars players
People from Gradiška, Bosnia and Herzegovina
Serbs of Bosnia and Herzegovina
Small forwards